Ekornes is a surname. Notable people with the surname include:

Jens E. Ekornes (1908–1976), Norwegian businessman
Jens Petter Ekornes (1942–2008), Norwegian businessman, nephew of Jens
Kenneth Ekornes (born 1974), Norwegian jazz musician